EVG may refer to:
 East View Geospatial, an American map company
 Eisenbahn- und Verkehrsgewerkschaft, a German trade union
 Elvitegravir
 Sveg Airport, in Sweden
 German initialism for Europäische Verteidigungsgemeinschaft, the European Defence Community (1952)